Elthorne is an  electoral ward of the London Borough of Ealing.

As of 2018, the ward is represented by three Labour councillors. Ealing Council is run by a Labour administration. The population of Elthorne ward at the 2011 Census was 14,539.

Political status of Ealing Council:
 Labour: 40 seats
 Conservatives: 23 seats
 Liberal Democrats: 5 seats
 UKIP: 1 seat

Elthorne is within the Ealing Southall parliamentary constituency, represented since 2007 by Labour Member of Parliament Virendra Sharma.

Elthorne is in the London Assembly constituency of Ealing and Hillingdon which has one Assembly Member: Dr Onkar Sahota (Labour), who was elected in May 2012.

References

External links
Contact details for Elthorne councillors Nigel Bakhai (LD), Yoel Gordon (Lab) & Anita Kapoor (Con)

Wards of the London Borough of Ealing